District 6 is a district north of the old town in the Swiss city of Zürich.

The district comprises the quarters Unterstrass and Oberstrass. Both entities were formerly municipalities of their own, but were incorporated into Zürich in 1893.

District 6 of Zürich
6